The ASA Late Model Series is an American stock car racing series. Founded by Ron Varney in 2003 as the "USPRO Cup Series", it was renamed "ASA Late Model Series" when it was purchased by the American Speed Association in 2004. After financial difficulties during the 2004 season, the series was sold back to its founders, but retained the name.

In the fall of 2005, Varney purchased the Southern All-Stars Asphalt Late Model Series to form the ASA Late Models South Series, plus the creation of the ASA Late Models North Series as regional touring series. The ASA Late Model Series was renamed the ASA Late Model Challenge Series.

Champions

Challenge Division
2010: Brent Downey
2009: Brian Campbell
2008: Peter Cozzolino
2007: Travis Dassow
2006: Kelly Bires (also won Pat Burdow Memorial Rookie of the Year)
2005: Stephen Leicht
2004: Bobby Stremme (also won Pat Burdow Memorial Rookie of the Year)
2003: Mark Kortz (as USPro Cup Series)

Northern Division
2010: Eddie Hoffman
2009: Chris Eggleston
2008: Eddie Hoffman
2007: Trent Snyder
2006: Jesse Smith

Southern Division
2009: Drew Brannon
2008: Jimmy Lang
2007: Jeff Choquette
2006: James Buescher

ASA naming dispute 
As part of the splinter of the American Speed Association caused by the 2004 season, the American Speed Association was broken up.  The Late Model Series was reacquired by Varney, while other assets were sold to Racing Speed Associates, led by Dennis Huth.

On December, 2007, Dennis Huth filed a lawsuit against the ASA Late Model Series seeking to invalidate and cancel the ASA Late Model Series trademark registration. The ASA Late Model Series responded that the lawsuit is frivolous and without merit and plan counter sue Mr. Huth for damages caused by suit.

On January 14, 2009, the naming dispute was settled.  In the end, both parties were allowed to keep the "ASA" name, but the ASA Late Model Series was forced to come up with a new logo, and both parties agreed to inform the racing public that the ASA Late Model Series is not related to, affiliated with, nor sponsored or endorsed by American Speed Association or ASA Racing.

On October 11, 2010 it was announced publicly that in an Order signed on October 7, 2010 by US District Court Judge Matthew Kennelly, has permanently barred Louis R. (Ron) Varney, Jr, ASA Late Model Series, LLC and all those acting in concert or participation with them, including specifically ASALMS, LLC from any further use of the ASA or ASA Late Model Series brand on or in connection with automobile race events anywhere in the United States. The injunction was delivered at the 2010 Oktoberfest Race Weekend at the La Crosse Fairgrounds Speedway. This forced the ASA Late Model Series cars to remove the any decals with the "ASA" name, and the ASA Late Model Series trailer to be removed from the premises. The organization has not been active following the injunction.

References

External links
ASA Late Model Series (This is the series sold back to former owner Ron Varney after the demise of the ASA National Series.)
ASA Late Model South Series (the former Southern All-Star Asphalt Late Model Series)
ASA Late Model North Series (the South Series' northern counterpart)

Stock car racing series in the United States
Auto racing organizations in the United States
Stock car racing
Auto racing controversies